Baly is a surname. Notable people with the surname include:

 Ahmed Baly (born 1976), Egyptian judoka
 Joseph Sugar Baly (1816–1890), English doctor and entomologist
 Monica Baly (1914–1998), English nurse, historian, and advocate
 William Baly (1814–1861), English physician

See also
 Bally (disambiguation)